Hunting of Birds with a Hawk and a Bow is a 16th-century tapestry in the collection of the Metropolitan Museum of Art. Woven from dyed wool and silk thread, the tapestry is part of a larger series of hunting tapestries attributed to the Southern Netherlands.

References 

Tapestries
Collection of the Metropolitan Museum of Art
16th century in art